The Instituto Federal de Educação, Ciência e Tecnologia de Mato Grosso (IFMT) (Mato Grosso Federal Institute of Education, Science and Technology), also known as the late Centro Federal de Educação Tecnológica de Mato Grosso, is an institution that offers high and professional educations by having a pluricurricular form. It is an multicampi institution, especialized in offering professional and technological education.

IFMT has the objective of forming ethical citizens and professionals and of being an institution involved with the society. Its actions point toward the development of new technologies, cultural and social investments and the formation of critical citizens. The students abilities are improved and testes through the courses, helping them to develop the "know-how", and values concerning to all the areas.

Campuses 

Campus Cuiabá - Octahyde Jorge da Silva
Campus Cuiabá - Bela Vista
Campus São Vicente
Campus Cáceres
Campus Barra do Garças
Campus Campo Novo do Parecis
Campus Confresa
Campus Juína
Campus Pontes e Lacerda
Campus Rondonópolis
Campus Sorriso
Campus Sinop
Campus Diamantino
Campus Lucas do Rio Verde
Campus Várzea Grande
Campus Alta Floresta
Campus Primavera do Leste

See also
Federal University of Mato Grosso

External links

Instituto Federal
Educational institutions established in 2008
Mato Grosso
2008 establishments in Brazil